Zisis Chatzistravos (born 16 December 1999) is a Greek professional footballer who plays as an attacking midfielder for Super League 2 club PAOK B.

Career

Early career
Chatzistravos joined PAOK in 2013, coming from Serres and Panserraikos. He was a key member of the Under-17 team, one of the leaders in the Under-19 title-winning teams, a youth international, and always with excellent development prospects. An attacking midfielder with rare talents, including an excellent technique, he is characterized by what his coaches have always called «football intelligence». He can also easily play ob both sides of the attack, as well as through the center. It should be emphasized that he is also a TEFAA student at the Democritus University of Thrace. He was loaned to Karaiskakis and Lamia, and is now returning to where he started.

Personal life 
 
Chatzistravos hails from Nigrita, Serres.

References

1999 births
Living people
Greek footballers
Greece youth international footballers
Super League Greece players
Super League Greece 2 players
PAOK FC players
A.E. Karaiskakis F.C. players
PAS Lamia 1964 players
Association football midfielders
People from Nigrita
Footballers from Central Macedonia
PAOK FC B players